Al-Sahel FC  is a Saudi Arabian football (soccer) team in Anak, Qatif City playing at the  Saudi First Division League.

Stadium
Prince Nayef bin Abdulaziz Stadium in Qatif, Saudi Arabia

Current squad 

As of Prince Mohammad bin Salman League:

References

Sahel
Sahel
Sahel
Sahel